Alméry Lobel-Riche born Alméric Joseph Riche (3 May 1877 – 11 May 1950) was a French painter, engraver, and illustrator.

References

External link

French painters
French engravers
French illustrators
1877 births
1950 deaths